Frans Oort (born 17 July 1935) is a Dutch mathematician who specializes in algebraic geometry.

Career
Oort studied from 1952 to 1958 at Leiden University, where he graduated with a thesis on elliptic curves. Oort was from 1961 at the University of Amsterdam, where he became a professor in 1967. In 1977, until his retirement in 2000, he was a professor at Utrecht University.

He was a visiting scholar at several academic institutions, including Harvard University (1966/67) and Aarhus University (1972/73). In 2008 he was the Eilenberg Professor at Columbia University.

His doctoral students include Bas Edixhoven, Michiel Hazewinkel, Aise Johan de Jong, Hendrik Lenstra and Joseph Steenbrink.

Research
Oort's research deals with, among other topics, abelian varieties and their modules. In 1994, he formulated what is now known as the André–Oort conjecture (generalizing a conjecture made in 1989 by Yves André). In 2000 Oort proved a conjecture made by Grothendieck in 1970.

Awards and honors
In 1962, Oort made a short contribution Multiple algebraic curves at the International Congress of Mathematicians in Stockholm, but was not an invited speaker. In 2011 he was elected a member of Academia Europaea. In July 2013, he gave a talk at the International Congress of Chinese Mathematicians in Taipei.

Personal life
Oort married and later divorced author  (1936–2020).

Selected publications
 Commutative group schemes, Springer 1966; 
 as editor: Algebraic Geometry, Oslo 1970, Wolters-Noordhoff 1972
 with Ke-Zheng Li: Moduli of supersingular abelian varieties, Springer 1998
 as editor with Steenbrink and van der Geer:  Arithmetic algebraic geometry , Birkhäuser 1991; 
 as editor with Carel Faber and Gerard van der Geer: Moduli of abelian varieties, Birkhäuser 2001
 
 with Ching-Li Chai:

References

External links
 Homepage in Utrecht
 

20th-century Dutch mathematicians
21st-century Dutch mathematicians
Algebraic geometers
Leiden University alumni
Academic staff of the University of Amsterdam
Academic staff of Utrecht University
Members of Academia Europaea
1935 births
Living people